Aditya Singh (born 12 December 1989) is an Indian cricketer. He made his first-class debut for Jammu & Kashmir in the 2008–09 Ranji Trophy on 3 November 2008.

References

External links
 

1989 births
Living people
Indian cricketers
Jammu and Kashmir cricketers
People from Jammu